Roman Kirsch is a German serial entrepreneur and investor in the tech- and consumer-internet-space.

Early life and education
Kirsch holds a business degree from the German business school WHU – Otto Beisheim School of Management. He also has a Master of Science degree from the London School of Economics in Finance, Accounting and Management. He also spent time at the University of Southern California as well as the Indian Institute of Management Bangalore.

Career
At the age of 13, Roman set up a business of importing watches from China. Later in 2003, at the age of 15, Kirsch founded his first company (a souvenir shop in Hamburg).

In 2011, Kirsch founded Casacanda; a furniture company that was later acquired by Fab.com in February 2012, making it one of the fastest company exits in tech history for one of the youngest founders. He spent a year as the CEO of Fab Europe until end of 2012 where he oversee the company reaching the unicorn status at a USD 1 billion valuation.

In 2012 Kirsch started investing and building multiple companies. In 2012 Roman was a founding investor of Amorelie, which became the female-focused lingerie company in Europe. In 2015 media company Pro7Sat1 acquired Amorelie, which is now valued at €100 million.

In 2013 Kirsch, alongside Matthias Wilrich and Robin Müller, founded the Berlin e-commerce startup Lesara with Kirsch as the CEO of the company. The company was awarded as fastest-growing tech company in Europe in 2016 by “The Next Web” and as the fastest growing tech company in Germany in 2017 by Deloitte.

Through his Rapid Pioneers Group Kirsch has co-founded and invested into several consumer technology and brands with a focus on Europe.

In 2015 Kirsch became the first investor and advisor in the Instagram-DTC-pioneer Fitvia. In June 2019 stock-listed Dermapharm announced the acquisition of 70% of the shares in Fitvia. Other consumer brands he has been a founding investor in are K-Beauty brand Yepoda, natural cosmetics brand Happyglam and couponing platform Lumaly.

The total portfolio of the Rapid Pioneers Group consists of over 25 companies, including green climate tech unicorn Enpal GmbH, Carprice, SevenSenders, Bending Spoons, Hive logistics, everdrop and Wild Cosmetics. In 2022 Kirsch was awarded as one of the best 50 seed investors in Europe by Business Insider.

In 2018, the company Lesara struggled with follow-on financing and had to declare bankruptcy, selling a part of the insolvency mass to Ladenzeile, a subsidiary of Axel Springer SE.

In April 2021, Kirsch has raised $345m in an IPO on the NASDAQ stock exchange for the investment vehicle Tio Tech. Kirsch serves as CEO of Tio Tech.

Awards and recognition
In January 2016, Forbes Magazine US listed Kirsch in its 30 under 30 Europe list for retail and e-commerce 
In 2017, the business magazine Capital listed Kirsch in its 40 under 40 list for young elites
He is also a "Global Shaper” of the World Economic Forum Davos and a member of YPO

See also
 Agile retail

References

1988 births
Living people
German company founders